B&B Italia SpA is an Italian modern furniture company whose products are sold worldwide. The company was founded in 1966 by the Busnelli family, who manages the company. On March 1, 2011, the Busnelli family became majority shareholders of the company once again and now own 100% of the shares.

The United States subsidiary, B&B Italia USA Inc., is located in Manhattan, New York in the Architects and Designers Building above their American flagship store in midtown.

B&B Italia has won four Compasso d'oro (Golden Compasses), the most prestigious Italian Design award.  In 1979 Le Bambole Mario Bellini, 1984 Sisamo Studio Kairos, 1987 Sity Antonio Citterio, and in 1989 B&B Italia became the first company to be recognized with a Compasso d'oro directly awarded to a design manufacturing company.  Since 1966 there have been over 1,000 B&B Italia designs (including prototypes).

Over 3% of B&B Italia's annual sales is reinvested in research and development. In 2010, a foaming department for upholstery was established with an investment of 4 million euros.

From the entry of The Carlyle Group into Investindustrial's design plan, Design Holding was born in September 2018 with the aim of creating the Italian hub of high-end interior design and then becoming it internationally. The brands already controlled by Investindustrial are part of the new company, led by Gabriele Del Torchio: Flos, B&B Italia and the Danish Louis Poulsen.

The B&B Italia group owns the B&B Italia, Maxalto, Azucena and Arclinea brands and reached 201.4 million in revenues in 2019 with exports accounting for over 80%. Sales in 80 countries through a network of 10 flagship stores, 70 single-brand stores and 1000 resellers.

Collections
B&B Italia has two divisions; the Home Division (focused on the residential market) and the Contract Division (for hospitality, marine, retail and offices).  There are two brands; B&B Italia and Maxalto.  Within B&B Italia there are four collections.

B&B Italia Home: Defined by products such as the Up Series Chair by Gaetano Pesce, the Charles Sofa by Antonio Citterio, Tufty Time by Patricia Urquiola and The Moon System Sofa by Zaha Hadid, the B&B Italia Home Collection is the base upon which the company was built.

Maxalto: The Maxalto Collection was established in 1975. The collection includes products with shapes drawing inspiration from the typologies and styles of French design between the two World Wars. Maxalto is a line of interior furnishings designed and coordinated by Antonio Citterio.  Maxalto is often sold within B&B Italia stores but has in the last decade established itself more and more as its own brand. The first stand alone Maxalto store opened in Paris, France. In 2008 the first monobrand store in the US opened in Chicago, Illinois, followed soon after by Miami, Florida.

There are four collections within Maxalto: Apta, Simplice, AC and, released in 2010, Acro.  Maxalto was featured in 2008 in the James Bond film Quantum of Solace.

B&B Italia Outdoor: Designed for indoor/outdoor living. It started with Canasta by Patricia Urquiola in 2007. Since then, the collection has grown to include pieces by Jean-Marie Massaud and Marcel Wanders in addition to new pieces by Patricia Urquiola and Atelier Oï. New products for the line are being designed by Naoto Fukasawa and Antonio Citterio.

B&B Italia Project: The Project Collection is a range of tables, chairs and soft seating for the contract market. It is often used in workplaces, restaurants, hotels, and public spaces.

B&B Italia Object: The Object Collection includes vases, trays, bowls, pillows, lighting and accessories.

B&B Italia Contract: The B&B Italia Contract Division handles the “turnkey” projects for furnishings and/or layout in hotel areas, offices, retail, institutions, stores, cruise liners, etc. The Contract Division manages contracts for furnishings, from projects to logistics and from materials procurement to installation. The Contract Division has completed the newly opened W Retreat and Spa of Vieques Island designed with Patricia Urquiola and The Nieuw Amsterdam Luxury Cruise Line for Holland America with 1564 cabins. It was launched in Venice on July 4.  Future projects include the W Hotel St. Petersburg designed by Antonio Citterio and two exclusive resorts in Greece.

MOOOI: B&B Italia owns 25% of the design company Moooi. Moooi is a Dutch company for which Marcel Wanders serves as co-owner and art director and Casper Vissers as co-owner and CEO.

Distribution: B&B Italia and Maxalto have 750 points of sale worldwide including seven flagship stores (Milan, London, Munich, Paris, Chicago and two in New York), 20 monobrand stores and over 70 "Shop-in-Shops".

Designers who have worked with the B&B Italia design department include Antonio Citterio, Patricia Urquiola, Gaetano Pesce, Naoto Fukasawa, Zaha Hadid, Marcel Wanders, Richard Sapper, Afra and Tobia Scarpa, Jean-Marie Massaud, Jeffrey Bernett, Mario Bellini, Studio Kairos, Paolo Piva, Richard Schultz, Atelier Oi, David Chipperfield, C. Gerhards and A. Glucker, Chris Howker, Ettore Sottsass, Gabriele and Oscar Buratti, Jakob Wagner, Monica Armani, Nicole Aebischer, Roberto Barbieri, Uwe Fischer, and Vincent Van Duysen.

See also 

List of Italian companies

References

External links
 B&B Italia website
 B&B Italia USA Quickship website
 Moooi website
HomePortfolio.com: Profile of B&B Italia

Design companies of Italy
Furniture companies of Italy
Luxury brands
Modernism
Design companies established in 1966
Manufacturing companies established in 1966
Italian brands
Italian companies established in 1966